Tanarus may refer to:
 Tanaro River, in north-western Italy - Tanarus in Latin
 Tanarus (beetle), a genus of beetles in the tribe Hyperini
 Tanarus (video game), an online 1997 tank first-person shooter 
 Tanarus, another name for the Celtic god of thunder Taranis
 Tanarus, a disguised form of Ulik the Troll, an old enemy of Thor, who attempted to replace/erase his role as the "God of Thunder" after his death at the end of Fear Itself

See also
 Taranis (disambiguation)